Boldklubben af 1967 (also known as B-67 or B-67 Nuuk) is a sports club from Greenland based in Nuuk. They compete in football, badminton and handball. In 2016 they won the Coca Cola GM by defeating Nagdlunguaq-48 3–1. In the 1980s they were a small club in the heart of Nuuk. They mainly focused on youth development during the mid-1980s, significantly helping this side's rise to fame.

B-67 took part in many competitions but went without a trophy for 25 years. In 1993, the club began to grow with the signings of elite Nordic players and training facilities grew, massively impacting the squad. With better coaching, this B-67 side won 85% of their senior matches and played in 8 finals after 1988, yet winning none.

Eleven players from B-67 Nuuk played for the Greenland national football team. In the Island Games, they placed 5th. 

B-67 played several matches against teams in Iceland and the Faroe Islands with an average win rate of 74%. They had success in Copenhagen, Reykjavík, and Tórshavn. The U-19 team had many successes in Malmö particularly, with a win rate of 84%.

Since then, they have gone on to win many championships (a record 13 times) making history in the country's capital. They have proven successful against local rivals, with a current win rate of 82%, the highest being at 91% in 2008 and lowest in 2020, 78%. Despite this, they are regarded as the most stylish playing team in the league's history, with hopes for European play soon. 

In other sports, they also play badminton and handball.

History

Domestic history
Key

Honours and achievements
Greenlandic Football Championship:
Winners (13): 1993, 1994, 1996, 1999, 2005, 2008, 2010, 2012, 2013, 2014, 2015, 2016, 2018
Runners-up (5): 2002, 2004, 2011, 2017, 2022

Current squad

References

External links 
 Official Website
 Club Facebook

Football clubs in Greenland
Association football clubs established in 1967
Sport in Nuuk
1967 establishments in Greenland
Handball clubs in Greenland